The 1940–41 Iowa State Cyclones men's basketball team represented Iowa State College in the 1940–41 college basketball season. The team was led by 13th-year head coach Louis Menze. In 1939–40, the Cyclones finished 9-9 overall (2-8 in the Big Six Conference). The team's captains were Al Budolfson and Gordon Nicholas. The Cyclones shared the Big Six conference championship with the Kansas Jayhawks. This marked the first time that Iowa State had ever qualified for the postseason; they would face Creighton in a district qualifying game for the 1941 NCAA Tournament, where they would fall, 57-48.

Roster

Player stats 
Note: PPG = Points per Game

Schedule 

|-
!colspan=6 style=""|Regular Season

|-
!colspan=6 style=""|Postseason

|-

References 
https://s3.amazonaws.com/sidearm.sites/isuni.sidearmsports.com/documents/2020/4/23/2020_21_Results2.pdf

Iowa State Cyclones men's basketball seasons
Iowa State